Erick O'Brien Green (born May 9, 1991) is an American professional basketball player for Budućnost VOLI in the Prva A Liga and the ABA League. He finished the 2012–13 NCAA Division I season as the top scorer in the nation at 25.0 points per game. Green was selected by the Utah Jazz with the 46th overall pick in the 2013 NBA draft, but was later traded to the Denver Nuggets.

High school career
Green was born in Inglewood, California but grew up in Winchester, Virginia. He spent the first three years of his prep career at his hometown's Millbrook High School, before transferring for his senior year to Fairfax's Paul VI Catholic High School. Between the two schools, Green earned four varsity letters. In his lone year at Paul VI, he led the Panthers to a state championship (coincidentally, Green had led Millbrook to a state championship the previous season) and was named the 2009 Division I Independent League Player of the Year. After Paul VI's championship he was named an EA Sports All-American. The Washington Post also selected him to their All-Metro Team, the Associated Press picked him as their Virginia Group AA Player of the Year, and Green was named the district and region player of the year.

College career

Green struggled his freshman season in 2009–10 and averaged just 2.6 points per game and shot 29.3% from the field. His lack of production, he later admitted, "turned [him] into a gym rat" and motivated him to work harder than everyone else to improve his game. Each progressive season he increased his scoring, rebounding and assist averages. By his senior season in 2012–13, and while leading NCAA Division I in scoring for most of the year, the media was discussing Green as a dark horse candidate for Atlantic Coast Conference Player of the Year. Despite his production, the Hokies finished the year with a 13–19 overall record, including a 4–14 conference record where they finished in last place. On March 12, 2013, Green was named the ACC Player of the Year by the ACC's media selectors (Miami's Shane Larkin was the coaches' pick). He joined Maryland's Len Bias (1985–86) as the only two players of the year who competed for teams with losing ACC records.

Professional career

Montepaschi Siena (2013–2014)
On June 27, 2013, Green was selected by the Utah Jazz with the 46th overall pick in the 2013 NBA draft; his rights were immediately traded to the Denver Nuggets. He joined the Nuggets for the 2013 NBA Summer League where he averaged 9.3 points, 2.2 rebounds and 1.8 assists in six games.

On August 26, 2013, Green signed a one-year deal with Montepaschi Siena of the LBA. In 45 Italian league games for Siena, in 2013–14, he averaged 10.8 points, 1.5 rebounds, and 1.1 assists per game. He also averaged 11.1 points, 1.7 rebounds, and 1.0 assists per game, in 10 games played in the EuroLeague that same season.

Denver Nuggets (2014–2015)
In July 2014, Green re-joined the Denver Nuggets for the 2014 NBA Summer League. On August 1, 2014, he signed a three-year, $2.3 million contract with the Nuggets after averaging an impressive 16.6 points per game over five Summer League contests for the team. On January 20, 2015, he was assigned to the Fort Wayne Mad Ants of the NBA Development League. Five days later, he was recalled by the Nuggets. In the Nuggets' season finale on April 15, he had a season-best game with 17 points, 7 assists, 4 rebounds and 1 steal in a loss to the Golden State Warriors.

In July 2015, Green re-joined the Nuggets for the 2015 NBA Summer League where he averaged 14.8 points, 1.4 rebounds, 4.0 assists and 1.8 steals in five games. On November 5, 2015, he was waived by the Nuggets.

Reno Bighorns and Utah Jazz (2015–2016)
On November 21, 2015, Green was acquired by the Reno Bighorns of the NBA Development League. He made his debut for the Bighorns later that night, scoring 23 points in 35 minutes off the bench against the Los Angeles D-Fenders. On January 29, 2016, he was named in the West All-Star team for the 2016 NBA D-League All-Star Game.

On January 26, 2016, Green signed a 10-day contract with the Utah Jazz. The next day, he made his debut for the Jazz in a 102–73 win over the Charlotte Hornets, recording four points and one assist in four minutes of action. On February 5, he signed a second 10-day contract with the Jazz. On February 15, the Jazz did not renew his contract, making him a free agent. Four days later, he re-joined the Bighorns. At the season's end, he was named to the All-NBA D-League First Team.

Olympiacos (2016–2017)
On July 15, 2016, Green signed a two-year deal with Olympiacos Piraeus. On February 2, 2017, Green recorded a season-high 25 points, shooting 10-of-13 from the field, along with three rebounds and two assists in a 90–75 win over UNICS Kazan. Green helped Olympiacos to reach the 2017 EuroLeague Final, where they eventually lost to Fenerbahçe.

Valencia (2017–2018)

On July 21, 2017, Green signed with Spanish club Valencia Basket for the 2017–18 season. Green helped Valencia to win the 2017 Spanish Supercup and was named the Tournament MVP after averaging 15.5 points in two games.

Fenerbahçe (2018–2019)
On October 26, 2018, Green signed with the Turkish team Fenerbahçe as an injury cover for Tyler Ennis. On July 10, 2019, Green and Fenerbahçe officially parted ways.

Fujian Sturgeons (2018–2019)
In July 2019, Green signed a one-year deal with the Fujian Sturgeons of the  Chinese Basketball Association (CBA).

Coosur Real Betis (2020)
On January 28, 2020, he has signed with Coosur Real Betis of the Liga ACB

Bahçeşehir Koleji (2020–2021)
On June 25, 2020, he has signed with Bahçeşehir Koleji of the Turkish Basketbol Süper Ligi (BSL).

Hapoel Holon (2022)
On September 28, 2022, he has signed with Hapoel Holon of the Israeli Basketball Premier League.

KK Budućnost (2022–present)
On December 29, 2022, he signed with Budućnost VOLI in the Prva A Liga.

Career statistics

NBA

Regular season

|-
| style="text-align:left;"| 
| style="text-align:left;"| Denver
| 43 || 1 || 9.5 || .377 || .298 || .833 || .7 || .9 || .3 || .0 || 3.4
|-
| style="text-align:left;"| 
| style="text-align:left;"| Denver
| 3 || 0 || 2.3 || .000 || .000 || .000 || .3 || .3 || .0 || .0 || .0
|-
| style="text-align:left;"| 
| style="text-align:left;"| Utah
| 6 || 0 || 5.8 || .417 || .250 || 1.000 || .8 || .3 || .2 || .0 || 2.2
|- class="sortbottom"
| colspan=2 style="text-align:center;"| Career
| 52 || 1 || 8.7 || .377 || .288 || .857 || .7 || .8 || .3 || .0 || 3.1

EuroLeague

|-
| style="text-align:left;"| 2013–14
| style="text-align:left;"| Montepaschi
| 10 || 9 || 24.4 || .421 || .343 || .692 || 1.7 || 1.0 || .9 || .0 || 11.1 || 7.2
|-
| style="text-align:left;"| 2016–17
| style="text-align:left;"| Olympiacos
| 35 || 4 || 20.3 || .471 || .400 || .817 || 1.9 || .9 || .7 || .1 || 9.9 || 8.0
|-
| style="text-align:left;"| 2017–18
| style="text-align:left;"| Valencia
| 28 || 16 || 24.6 || .445 || .417 || .900 || 1.6 || 1.7 || .7 || .0 || 14.3 || 13.5
|- class="sortbottom"
| colspan=2 style="text-align:center;"| Career
| 74 || 29 || 22.2 || .440 || .393 || .860 || 1.8 || 1.2 || .7 || .1 || 11.8 || 9.8

See also
 List of NCAA Division I men's basketball season scoring leaders

References

External links

 euroleague.net profile
 Lega Basket profile 
 Virginia Tech Hokies bio 
 

1991 births
Living people
21st-century African-American sportspeople
African-American basketball players
All-American college men's basketball players
American expatriate basketball people in Greece
American expatriate basketball people in Italy
American expatriate basketball people in Spain
American expatriate basketball people in Turkey
American men's basketball players
Bahçeşehir Koleji S.K. players
Basketball players from Inglewood, California
Basketball players from Virginia
Denver Nuggets players
Fenerbahçe men's basketball players
Fort Wayne Mad Ants players
Hapoel Holon players
Liga ACB players
Mens Sana Basket players
Olympiacos B.C. players
People from Winchester, Virginia
Point guards
Reno Bighorns players
Shooting guards
Utah Jazz draft picks
Utah Jazz players
Valencia Basket players
Universo Treviso Basket players
Virginia Tech Hokies men's basketball players